Centaurium  pulchellum  is a species of flowering plant in the gentian family known by the common name lesser centaury, or slender centaury. It differs from Centaurium erythraea by lacking basal rosette of leaves and by having a developed peduncle below the flowers. It is often much smaller, less than ten centimetres. It is native to the southern temperate parts of Europe.

Description
Sometimes it is reduced to a single stem with one flower. By the time it flowers, from June to September, there is no basal rosette. The leafy stem has opposite pairs of narrow oval leaves. Like other members of the family, the flowers close in the afternoon. The calyx is about as long as the fruit, which is a cylindrical capsule.

Distribution and habitat
This plant is found in the southerly temperate zones of Europe. It occurs mainly in the southern half of the British Isles, especially near the south coast of England. It grows on a range of soil types, from calcareous to mildly acidic. On the coast it can be found in open sandy and muddy turf, often in saltmarshes, sand dunes and beside estuaries. Inland it inhabits lowland dry, open grasslands, heaths, woodland glades and rides, marl pits and other unshaded, disturbed ground. In Morecambe Bay, it is at the northern end of its range on the saltmarshes, growing with Juncus gerardii, Juncus maritimus, Blysmus rufus and Eleocharis quinqueflora.

References

pulchellum
Flora of Europe
Flora of temperate Asia
Flora of tropical Asia
Flora of Africa